Euonymus cochinchinensis is a tree of tropical Asia in the staff vine family Celastraceae. The specific epithet  refers to the species being native to Indo-China.

Description
The flowers are greenish yellow. The fruits are obovoid to roundish in shape.

Distribution and habitat
Euonymus cochinchinensis grows naturally in Hainan, Taiwan, Indo-China, Malesia and Papua New Guinea. Its habitat is coastal forests.

References

cochinchinensis
Trees of China
Flora of Hainan
Trees of Taiwan
Trees of Indo-China
Trees of Malesia
Trees of Papua New Guinea
Plants described in 1894
Taxonomy articles created by Polbot